So Evil, My Sister is a 1974 American horror film, starring Susan Strasberg and Faith Domergue.

It was directed by Reginald Le Borg.

Cast
Susan Strasberg as Brenda
Faith Domergue as Millie Hartman
Charles Knox Robinson as Jerry
Sydney Chaplin as George
Steve Mitchell as Lt. Haze
Ben Frank as Woody
John Howard as Dr. Thomas
Biff Yeager as Bill
Kathleen Freeman as Hilda

References

External links
So Evil My Sister at BFI

1974 television films
1974 films
1974 horror films
American horror television films
Films directed by Reginald Le Borg
1970s American films